Julius Popp (born 1973, Nuremberg) is an artist based in Leipzig.

His work often uses technology, resulting in interdisciplinary ventures which reach across the boundaries of art and science.  An example of Popp’s work is Bitfall (2005):  a machine which displays words selected from the internet via drops of falling water in precise configuration, each word visible only for a second. A bit.fall installation was at the London 2012 Olympic Park under the footbridge between the main entrance and stadium, the words generated using water from the Waterworks River were chosen at random from internet news feeds.

Popp studied at the Hochschule für Grafik und Buchkunst in Leipzig and he won the Robot Choice Award in 2003.  The Fraunhofer Institute IAIS, Bonn, and the Computer Science and Artificial Intelligence Laboratory at MIT have both studied elements of Popp’s work which made unique advances in the field of artificial intelligence.

Bit.Flow 
Bit.Flow is one project done by Julius Popp between 2004–2008 in Leipzig. Navigating through the modern world is no longer linear: the thread can no longer serve as a model to describe it. In Bit.flow dozens of small particles make up a chaotic swarm of bits, which are the smallest pieces of information. This installation illustrates how each of the individual elements has no significance in itself but acquires it only in terms of the group, within the framework of swarm interaction.

Selected exhibitions 
 2017 "BIT.FALL" Pacific Place, Hong Kong
 2011 I/O/I. The senses of machines (Interaction Laboratory) Disseny Hub Barcelona
 2009 Moscow bienalle of contemporary art
 2007 Oboro, Montreal
 2005 Psychoscape, Kunsthalle, Budapest
 2005 D-Haus, Tokyo
 2005 ICHIM, Transmissions, Paris
 2005 Union Gallery, London (with Oliver Kossack, Julia Schmidt)
 2004 50% Realität, Kunstraum B/2, Leipzig
 2004 Artexpo, New York
 2003 Artbots - The Robot Talent Show, Eyebeam Gallery, New York City
 2002 Paradies, Halle/Saale
 2001 Heimat L.E., organised by Galerie für zeitgenössische Kunst and HGB, Leipzig

Awards 
 2009 - LVZ Kunstpreis, Leipzig

References

External links 
Short documentary about Julius Popp’s BitFall project
Julius Popp at UNION Gallery
Official site
The 2003 Robot Talent Show

1973 births
Living people
Artists from Leipzig
Hochschule für Grafik und Buchkunst Leipzig alumni